The Clarence Kleinkopf Round Barn is a round barn in McDonough County, Illinois, United States. The correct GPS coordinates are: 40.45506936294263, -90.81113789160236. Carpenter Dick Carmack built the barn in 1915 for farmer George Welch. The barn's entrances are on the west, south, and northwest sides. A haymow encircles three-quarters of the barn at the roof's base, and a ventilator sits at the roof's peak.

The barn was added to the National Register of Historic Places in 1982. It is one of the original round barns submitted to the Register as part of the Round Barns in Illinois Multiple Property Submission.

Two other barns built by Carmack within 2 miles no longer survive.

References

Barns on the National Register of Historic Places in Illinois
Buildings and structures in McDonough County, Illinois
Round barns in Illinois
National Register of Historic Places in McDonough County, Illinois